The Mills Corporation was a publicly traded real estate investment trust headquartered in Chevy Chase, Maryland, United States, acquired on April 3, 2007 by an investment group composed of Simon Property Group and Farallon Capital Management. The company developed, owned, and operated major super-regional shopping malls. The company built 18 "Landmark" centers in which the malls were named after "Mills", like "Vaughan Mills", or "St. Louis Mills"; and also over 20 "21st Century Retail" regional malls that they started operating in 2002, like Del Amo Fashion Center and Southdale Center. Most former Mills facilities have a large movie theater from 10–30 screens, and a large food court (sometimes two). Their facilities were normally built in colorful modern/abstract architectural designs, but in recent years have been renovated to more conventional designs with mainly neutral colors. Simon Property Group assumed management of the former Mills properties after the acquisition, and is operating the former "Landmark Mills" group as a separate operating segment within its organization.

Company history
The company started in 1967 as the Western Development Corporation, and its first mall was Potomac Mills in the Washington, D.C. metropolitan area in 1985. Then from 1989–1991, Franklin, Sawgrass, & Gurnee Mills opened each of those years, respectively. In 1994 the company converted to Real Estate Investment Trust (REIT) status and changed its name to "The Mills Corporation".

In 1996, with new CEO Lawrence Siegel, The Mills built Ontario Mills near Los Angeles, which was the company's first mall built abstractly and with a full oval racetrack design which followed into the rest of the company's built malls. Since opening Ontario Mills until 2005 with Pittsburgh Mills, The Mills built and opened at least one or two landmark malls each year.

In 2002, The Mills acquired six regular retail malls including the ailing Forest Fair Mall (became Cincinnati Mills from 2004–2009) and a nine mall portfolio in 2004, including former Taubman Centers, like Columbus City Center in order to redevelop and expanded to be more affordable centers.  Also, the company also expanded to Europe with the opening of Madrid Xanadú in Spain.

The success of Madrid Xanadú prompted The Mills to embark on the $1 billion+ Meadowlands Xanadu complex in 2004, which was first planned as "Meadowlands Mills", but the project has caused numerous delays and cost the company financially. It was eventually sold to another developer, who planned it as American Dream Meadowlands.

In November 2004, Vaughan Mills was the first Mills Landmark built in Canada, and continued its international success with the acquisition of the St. Enoch Centre in Scotland and was offered to build a center in Rome, Italy.

After their last built mall was opened, Galleria at Pittsburgh Mills in July 2005, the company was investigated by the Securities & Exchange Commission for its financial problems.

Acquisition by Simon Property Group
On January 17, 2007, the Mills Corporation agreed to a buyout from Brookfield Asset Management, based out of Toronto. The deal was valued at US$1.35 billion. The company was forced to seek help after a possible management misconduct resulted in a $350 million accounting error. Brookfield would have paid $21 for each share of Mills Corporation.  However, on February 13, 2007, Mills announced that their board had determined that a competing offer from Simon Property Group of Indianapolis, Indiana was superior to the Brookfield offer. Brookfield had the option to submit a counter offer, but February 16, 2007, Simon Property Group and Farallon Capital agreed to acquire Mills for $25.25 per common share.

On April 6, 2007, Farallon and Simon completed the acquisition of Mills. All former Mills malls became Simon properties at the acquisition date and are now shown on Simon's website. The Mills became Simon's fifth retail platform, along with Regional Malls (the 21st Century malls included) and Chelsea Premium Outlets. The new platform (for Landmark Mills only) is known as The Mills: A Simon Company.

Former Mills properties
Algonquin Mills – Rolling Meadows, Illinois
Arizona Mills – Tempe (Phoenix), Arizona
Arundel Mills – Hanover (Baltimore), Maryland
The Block at Orange – Orange (Los Angeles), California
Briarwood Mall – Ann Arbor, Michigan
Cincinnati Mall (formerly Forest Fair Mall & Cincinnati Mills) – Cincinnati, Ohio 
Colorado Mills – Lakewood (Denver), Colorado
Concord Mills – Concord (Charlotte), North Carolina
Columbus City Center – Downtown Columbus, Ohio (Mall now closed for redevelopment)
Del Amo Fashion Center – Torrance (Los Angeles), California
Sugarloaf Mills (formerly Discover Mills) – Lawrenceville (Atlanta), Georgia
Note: This is the first known instance of a developer selling naming rights to a mall in the United States.
Dover Mall – Dover, Delaware
The Esplanade – Kenner (New Orleans), Louisiana
The Falls – Miami, Florida
Galleria at White Plains – White Plains (New York City), New York
Grapevine Mills – Grapevine (Dallas–Fort Worth), Texas
Great Mall of the Bay Area – Milpitas (San Jose), California
Gurnee Mills – Gurnee (Chicago), Illinois
Hilltop Mall – Richmond, California
Katy Mills – Katy (Houston), Texas
Lakeforest Mall – Gaithersburg (Washington, D.C.), Maryland 
The Mall at Tuttle Crossing – Dublin (Columbus), Ohio
Marley Station – Glen Burnie (Baltimore), Maryland
Meadowood Mall – Reno, Nevada
Northpark Mall – Ridgeland (Jackson), Mississippi
Ontario Mills – Ontario (Los Angeles), California
Opry Mills - Nashville, Tennessee
Philadelphia Mills (formerly Franklin Mills) – Philadelphia, Pennsylvania
Potomac Mills – Woodbridge (Washington, D.C.), Virginia 
Sawgrass Mills – Sunrise (Fort Lauderdale), Florida 
The Shops at Riverside – Hackensack, New Jersey
Southdale Center – Edina (Minneapolis), Minnesota
Southridge Mall – Milwaukee, Wisconsin
Stoneridge Mall – Pleasanton, California
Powerplex STL (formerly St. Louis Mills & St. Louis Outlet Mall) – Hazelwood (St. Louis), Missouri
Westland Mall – Hialeah (Miami), Florida

Properties sold by Mills prior to Simon acquisition
Madrid Xanadu – near a reiterated recommendation from the Third Evaluation Round, built in 2003 by Mills, sold to Ivanhoe Cambridge in 2006.
St. Enoch Centre – Glasgow, Scotland, acquired 50/50 stake in January 2005, sold interest to Ivanhoe Cambridge.
Vaughan Mills – (Vaughan, Ontario) Built in 2004 and the first Mills property outside the U.S.; Mills sold its share in July 2006 to Ivanhoe Cambridge.
Pittsburgh Mills – Tarentum (Pittsburgh), Pennsylvania Built in 2005, was the first Mills landmark to feature full priced stores; Mills sold its share in mall in December 2006 to Zamias Services, Inc.

Under development
These properties were in development by Mills Corporation before the Simon acquisition:

Canada
CrossIron Mills – Calgary, Alberta  (Opened August 2009)
Tsawwassen Mills – Delta, BC  (Opened October 2016)

Italy
Mercati Generali – Rome, Italy

United States
108 North State Street – Chicago, Illinois
American Dream Meadowlands – East Rutherford, New Jersey
Stonebridge at Potomac Town Center – Woodbridge, Virginia

References

External links
The Mills Corporation website

Defunct real estate companies of the United States
Real estate investment trusts of the United States
Shopping center management firms
Real estate companies established in 1967
Simon Property Group
Defunct companies based in Maryland
1967 establishments in Maryland
2007 disestablishments in Maryland
Real estate companies disestablished in 2007
2007 mergers and acquisitions